Ahmetaj is a surname. Notable people with the surname include:

 Ajkune Ahmetaj, Kosovo Albanian celebrity hairdresser and philanthropist
 Alvi Ahmetaj (born 1998), Albanian footballer
 Arben Ahmetaj (born 1969), Albanian politician 

Albanian-language surnames
Patronymic surnames
Surnames from given names